La Línea de la Concepción Bus Station is a bus station serving the Spanish municipality of La Línea de la Concepción in the Andalusian Province of Cádiz. It is the terminal of the regular services of buses in this city and is managed by the company CTSA-Portillo.

Gibraltar does not have its own long distance bus station so this station also serves Gibraltarians who wish to travel through Spain by bus.

References

External links
Portillo Website
Comes Website
ALSA Website

Bus stations in Spain
La Línea de la Concepción